Sun-ok, also spelled Soon-ok, is a feminine Korean name or proper noun. Its meaning differs based on the hanja used to write each syllable of the name. There are 31 hanja with the reading "sun" and five hanja with the reading "ok" on the South Korean government's official list of hanja which may be registered for use in given names.

People with this name include:
Kim So-hee (singer, born 1917) (birth name Kim Sun-ok; 1917–1995), South Korean traditional musician
Lee Soon-ok (born 1947), North Korean defector and former political prisoner
Jeon Soon-ok (born 1954), South Korean labour activist and National Assembly member
Jung Soon-ok (volleyball) (born 1955), South Korean former volleyball player
Lee Soon-ok (volleyball) (born 1955), South Korean former volleyball player
Kim Soon-ok (screenwriter) (born 1971), South Korean screenwriter
Jung Soon-ok (born 1983), South Korean long jumper
Kim Soon-ok (table tennis), South Korean table tennis player

See also
List of Korean given names
Gong Sun-ok (born 1963), South Korean novelist
Kim Sun-ok (bobsledder) (born 1980), South Korean bobsledder

References

Korean feminine given names